Per Skift (born Per Anker Christensen, May 10, 1920 – January 10, 1994) was a Norwegian actor.

Skift made his stage debut in 1944 at Chat Noir in Oslo. He was then engaged with the Oslo New Theater, Trøndelag Theater, and Rogaland Theater until he started performing for the National Traveling Theater in 1972. Skift is best known his performances in operettas and musicals such as Die Fledermaus, Annie Get Your Gun, and Carmen.

Alongside his stage career, Skift also appeared in eight films between 1946 and 1964. He made his film debut in Toralf Sandø's Englandsfarere.

Filmography

1946: Englandsfarere as Arnfinn
1949: Aldri mer! (campaign film)
1952: Vi vil skilles as Leif
1954: Shetlandsgjengen as Bård Grotle
1957: Peter van Heeren as Peter van Heeren
1959: 5 loddrett as Jens
1962: Operasjon Løvsprett
1964: ''Nydelige nelliker

References

External links
 
 Per Skift at the Swedish Film Database
 Per Skift at Filmfront
 Per Skift at Sceneweb

1920 births
1994 deaths
20th-century Norwegian male actors
Male actors from Oslo